Edelsgrub is a former municipality in the district of Graz-Umgebung in the Austrian state of Styria. Since the 2015 Styria municipal structural reform, it is part of the municipality Nestelbach bei Graz.

Geography
Edelsgrub lies about 10 km east of Graz.

References

Cities and towns in Graz-Umgebung District